Frank Rushton (born 19 April 1909, date of death unknown) was a South African sprinter. He competed in the men's 4 × 400 metres relay at the 1936 Summer Olympics.

References

1909 births
Year of death missing
Athletes (track and field) at the 1936 Summer Olympics
South African male sprinters
South African male hurdlers
Olympic athletes of South Africa
Place of birth missing